Seffak (also Romanized as Şeffāk, Şaffāk, and Şefāk; also known as Beyt-e Şafūk and Şafāl) is a village in Anaqcheh Rural District, in the Central District of Ahvaz County, Khuzestan Province, Iran. At the 2006 census, its population was 712, in 123 families.

References 

Populated places in Ahvaz County